Predrag Vejin (born 17 December 1992) is a Serbian handball player who plays for RK Nexe Našice and the Serbia national team.

References

1992 births
Living people
People from Apatin
Serbian male handball players
Expatriate handball players
Mediterranean Games competitors for Serbia
Competitors at the 2018 Mediterranean Games
21st-century Serbian people